Roldugin is a Russian masculine surname, its feminine counterpart is Roldugina. Notable people with the surname include:

Aleksandr Roldugin (born 1990), Russian footballer
Sergei Roldugin (born 1951), Russian cellist

Russian-language surnames